The 2020–21 Denver Nuggets season was the 45th season of the franchise in the National Basketball Association (NBA), and the franchise's 54th season of existence overall.

On May 3, the Nuggets officially clinched a playoff spot for the third consecutive season. In the First Round, the Nuggets defeated the Portland Trail Blazers in six games, before getting swept in the Conference Semi-Finals by the Phoenix Suns.

Nikola Jokić was voted league MVP for the regular season, thereby becoming the first player in franchise history to win the award.

Draft

Roster

Standings

Division

Conference

Notes
 z – Clinched home court advantage for the entire playoffs
 c – Clinched home court advantage for the conference playoffs
 y – Clinched division title
 x – Clinched playoff spot
 pb – Clinched play-in spot
 o – Eliminated from playoff contention
 * – Division leader

Game log

Preseason

|- style="background:#fcc"
| 1
| December 12
| @ Golden State
| 
| Nikola Jokić (26)
| Nikola Jokić (10)
| Nikola Jokić (5)
| Chase Center0
| 0–1
|- style="background:#cfc"
| 2
| December 16
| Portland
| 
| Nikola Jokić (16)
| Nikola Jokić (11)
| Nikola Jokić (8)
| Ball Arena0
| 1–1
|- style="background:#cfc"
| 3
| December 18
| Portland
| 
| Paul Millsap (24)
| Michael Porter Jr. (9)
| Nikola Jokić (6)
| Ball Arena0
| 2–1

Regular season

|- style="background:#fcc"
| 1
| December 23
| Sacramento
| 
| Nikola Jokić (29)
| Nikola Jokić (15)
| Nikola Jokić (14)
| Ball Arena0
| 0–1
|- style="background:#fcc"
| 2
| December 25
| L. A. Clippers
| 
| Nikola Jokić (24)
| Nikola Jokić (9)
| Nikola Jokić (10)
| Ball Arena0
| 0–2
|- style="background:#cfc"
| 3
| December 28
| Houston
| 
| Jamal Murray (21)
| Nikola Jokić (12)
| Nikola Jokić (18)
| Ball Arena0
| 1–2
|- style="background:#fcc"
| 4
| December 29
| @ Sacramento
| 
| Michael Porter Jr. (30)
| Nikola Jokić (11)
| Nikola Jokić (12)
| Golden 1 Center0
| 1–3

|- style="background:#fcc"
| 5
| January 1
| Phoenix
| 
| Jamal Murray (31)
| Nikola Jokić (9)
| Nikola Jokić (11)
| Ball Arena0
| 1–4
|- style="background:#cfc"
| 6
| January 3
| @ Minnesota
| 
| Jamal Murray (36)
| Nikola Jokić (12)
| Nikola Jokić (12)
| Target Center0
| 2–4
|- style="background:#cfc"
| 7
| January 5
| Minnesota
| 
| Nikola Jokić (35)
| Nikola Jokić (15)
| Nikola Jokić (6)
| Ball Arena0
| 3–4
|- style="background:#fcc"
| 8
| January 7
| Dallas
| 
| Nikola Jokić (38)
| Nikola Jokić (11)
| Jamal Murray (9)
| Ball Arena0
| 3–5
|- style="background:#cfc"
| 9
| January 9
| @ Philadelphia
| 
| Gary Harris (21)
| Nikola Jokić (9)
| Nikola Jokić (12)
| Wells Fargo Center0
| 4–5
|- style="background:#cfc"
| 10
| January 10
| @ New York
| 
| Nikola Jokić (22)
| Nikola Jokić (10)
| Nikola Jokić (5)
| Madison Square Garden0
| 5–5
|- style="background:#fcc"
| 11
| January 12
| @ Brooklyn
| 
| Nikola Jokić (23)
| Nikola Jokić (8)
| Nikola Jokić (11)
| Barclays Center0
| 5–6
|- style="background:#cfc"
| 12
| January 14
| Golden State
| 
| Nikola Jokić (23)
| Nikola Jokić (14)
| Nikola Jokić (10)
| Ball Arena0
| 6–6
|- style="background:#fcc"
| 13
| January 17
| Utah
| 
| Nikola Jokić (35)
| Nikola Jokić (14)
| Nikola Jokić (9)
| Ball Arena0
| 6–7
|- style="background:#cfc"
| 14
| January 19
| Oklahoma City
| 
| Nikola Jokić (27)
| Jokić & Millsap (12)
| Barton & Jokić (6)
| Ball Arena0
| 7–7 
|- style="background:#cfc"
| 15
| January 22
| @ Phoenix
| 
| Nikola Jokić (31)
| Nikola Jokić (10)
| Jamal Murray (9)
| PHX Arena0
| 8–7
|- style="background:#cfc"
| 16
| January 23
| @ Phoenix
| 
| Nikola Jokić (29)
| Nikola Jokić (22)
| Nikola Jokić (6)
| PHX Arena0
| 9–7
|- style="background:#cfc"
| 17
| January 25
| @ Dallas
| 
| Michael Porter Jr. (30)
| Nikola Jokić (10)
| Monté Morris (6)
| American Airlines Center0
| 10–7
|- style="background:#cfc"
| 18
| January 27
| @ Miami
| 
| Nikola Jokić (21)
| Nikola Jokić (11)
| Gary Harris (7)
| American Airlines Arena0
| 11–7
|- style="background:#fcc"
| 19
| January 29
| @ San Antonio
| 
| Nikola Jokić (35)
| Nikola Jokić (10)
| Jamal Murray (7)
| AT&T Center0
| 11–8
|- style="background:#cfc"
| 20
| January 31
| Utah
| 
| Nikola Jokić (47)
| Nikola Jokić (11)
| Will Barton (6)
| Ball Arena0
| 12–8

|- style="background:#bbb"
| —
| February 1
| Detroit
| colspan="6" | Postponed (makeup date April 6)
|- style="background:#fcc"
| 21
| February 4
| @ L. A. Lakers
| 
| Jamal Murray (20)
| Jokić & Millsap (10)
| Nikola Jokić (6)
| Staples Center0
| 12–9
|- style="background:#fcc"
| 22
| February 6
| @ Sacramento
| 
| Nikola Jokić (50)
| R. J. Hampton (10)
| Nikola Jokić (12)
| Golden 1 Center0
| 12–10
|- style="background:#fcc"
| 23
| February 8
| Milwaukee
| 
| Nikola Jokić (35)
| Nikola Jokić (12)
| Nikola Jokić (6)
| Ball Arena0
| 12–11
|- style="background:#cfc"
| 24
| February 10
| Cleveland
| 
| Paul Millsap (22)
| Jokić & Green (6)
| Nikola Jokić (12)
| Ball Arena0
| 13–11
|- style="background:#cfc"
| 25
| February 12
| Oklahoma City
| 
| Jokić, Murray (22)
| Nikola Jokić (13)
| Nikola Jokić (9)
| Ball Arena0
| 14–11
|- style="background:#cfc"
| 26
| February 14
| L. A. Lakers
| 
| Jamal Murray (25)
| Nikola Jokić (16)
| Nikola Jokić (10)
| Ball Arena0
| 15–11
|- style="background:#fcc"
| 27
| February 16
| @ Boston
| 
| Nikola Jokic (43)
| Michael Porter Jr. (7)
| Facundo Campazzo (8)
| TD Garden0
| 15–12
|- style="background:#fcc"
| 28
| February 17
| @ Washington
| 
| Jamal Murray (35)
| JaMychal Green (10)
| Nikola Jokic (9)
| Capital One Arena0
| 15–13
|- style="background:#bbb"
| —
| February 19
| @ Charlotte
| colspan="6" | Postponed (makeup date May 11)
|- style="background:#fcc"
|- style="background:#cfc"
| 29
| February 19
| @ Cleveland
| 
| Jamal Murray (50)
| Nikola Jokic (12)
| Nikola Jokic (10)
| Rocket Mortgage FieldHouse2,720
| 16–13
|- style="background:#fcc"
| 30
| February 21
| @ Atlanta
| 
| Jamal Murray (30)
| Nikola Jokic (10)
| Nikola Jokic (6)
| State Farm Arena1,362
| 16–14
|- style="background:#cfc"
| 31
| February 23
| Portland
| 
| Nikola Jokic (41)
| Michael Porter Jr (10)
| Jamal Murray (8)
| Ball Arena0
| 17–14
|- style="background:#fcc"
| 32
| February 25
| Washington
| 
| Jamal Murray (34)
| Nikola Jokic (11)
| Nikola Jokic (7)
| Ball Arena0
| 17–15
|- style="background:#cfc"
| 33
| February 27
| @ Oklahoma City
| 
| Jamal Murray (26)
| Nikola Jokic (11)
| Nikola Jokic (13)
| Chesapeake Energy Arena0
| 18–15

|- style="background:#cfc"
| 34
| March 1
| @ Chicago
| 
| Nikola Jokic (39)
| Michael Porter Jr (15)
| Nikola Jokic (9)
| United Center0
| 19–15
|- style="background:#cfc"
| 35
| March 2
| @ Milwaukee
| 
| Nikola Jokic (37)
| Nikola Jokic (10)
| Nikola Jokic (11)
| Fiserv Forum1,800
| 20–15
|- style="background:#cfc"
| 36
| March 4
| @ Indiana
| 
| Michael Porter Jr. (24)
| Nikola Jokic (12)
| Jokic & Dozier (8)
| Bankers Life Fieldhouse0
| 21–15
|- align="center"
|colspan="9" bgcolor="#bbcaff"|All-Star Break
|- style="background:#cfc;"
| 37
| March 12
| @ Memphis
| 
| Nikola Jokic (28)
| Nikola Jokic (15)
| Nikola Jokic (7)
| FedExForum2,160
| 22–15
|- style="background:#fcc;"
| 38
| March 13
| Dallas
| 
| Nikola Jokic (26)
| Nikola Jokic (9)
| Nikola Jokic (11)
| Ball Arena0
| 22–16
|- style="background:#cfc;"
| 39
| March 15
| Indiana
| 
| Nikola Jokic (32)
| Nikola Jokic (14)
| Jamal Murray (8)
| Ball Arena0
| 23–16
|- style="background:#cfc"
| 40
| March 17
| Charlotte
| 
| Michael Porter Jr. (28)
| Michael Porter Jr. (13)
| Jokic & Campazzo (10)
| Ball Arena0
| 24–16
|- style="background:#cfc"
| 41
| March 19
| Chicago
| 
| Jokic & Murray (34)
| Nikola Jokic (15)
| Nikola Jokic (9)
| Ball Arena0
| 25–16
|- style="background:#fcc"
| 42
| March 21
| New Orleans
| 
| Nikola Jokic (29)
| Nikola Jokic (10)
| Nikola Jokic (10)
| Ball Arena0
| 25–17
|- style="background:#cfc"
| 43
| March 23
| @ Orlando
| 
| Nikola Jokic (28)
| Nikola Jokic (15)
| Nikola Jokic (10)
| Amway Center3,485
| 26–17
|- style="background:#fcc"
| 44
| March 24
| @ Toronto
| 
| Jokic, Murray (20)
| Nikola Jokic (10)
| Paul Millsap (6)
| Amalie Arena1,578
| 26–18
|- style="background:#cfc"
| 45
| March 26
| @ New Orleans
| 
| Nikola Jokic (37)
| Paul Millsap (7)
| Jamal Murray (11)
| Smoothie King Center3,700
| 27–18
|- style="background:#cfc"
| 46
| March 28
| Atlanta
| 
| JaMychal Green (20)
| Jokic, Porter Jr. (10)
| Nikola Jokic (8)
| Ball Arena0
| 28–18
|- style="background:#cfc"
| 47
| March 30
| Philadelphia
| 
| Jamal Murray (30)
| Michael Porter Jr. (12)
| Will Barton (6)
| Ball Arena3,574
| 29–18

|- style="background:#cfc"
| 48
| April 1
| @ L. A. Clippers
| 
| Jamal Murray (23)
| Jamal Murray (8)
| Nikola Jokic (7)
| Staples Center0
| 30–18
|- style="background:#cfc"
| 49
| April 4
| Orlando
| 
| Aaron Gordon (24)
| Michael Porter Jr. (12)
| Nikola Jokic (16)
| Ball Arena3,927
| 31–18
|- style="background:#cfc"
| 50
| April 6
| Detroit
| 
| Nikola Jokic (27)
| Nikola Jokic (8)
| Nikola Jokic (11)
| Ball Arena3,556
| 32–18
|- style="background:#cfc"
| 51
| April 7
| San Antonio
| 
| Nikola Jokic (25)
| Michael Porter Jr. (10)
| Nikola Jokic (10)
| Ball Arena3,715
| 33–18
|- style="background:#cfc"
| 52
| April 9
| San Antonio
| 
| Nikola Jokic (26)
| Nikola Jokic (13)
| Nikola Jokic (14)
| Ball Arena3,750
| 34–18
|- style="background:#fcc"
| 53
| April 11
| Boston
| 
| Michael Porter Jr. (22)
| Michael Porter Jr. (11)
| Nikola Jokic (11)
| Ball Arena4,032
| 34–19
|- style="background:#fcc"
| 54
| April 12
| @ Golden State
| 
| Nikola Jokic (27)
| Nikola Jokic (12)
| Nikola Jokic (8)
| Chase Center0
| 34–20
|- style="background:#cfc"
| 55
| April 14
| Miami
| 
| Michael Porter Jr. (25)
| Jokic & Porter Jr. (10)
| Nikola Jokic (11)
| Ball Arena4,017
| 35–20
|- style="background:#cfc"
| 56
| April 16
| @ Houston
| 
| Nikola Jokic (29)
| Nikola Jokic (16)
| Nikola Jokic (7)
| Toyota Center3,342
| 36–20
|- style="background:#cfc"
| 57
| April 19
| Memphis
| 
| Nikola Jokic (47)
| Nikola Jokic (15)
| Nikola Jokic (8)
| Ball Arena4,005
| 37–20
|- style="background:#cfc"
| 58
| April 21
| @ Portland
| 
| Nikola Jokic (25)
| Nikola Jokic (9)
| Nikola Jokic (5)
| Moda Center0
| 38–20
|- style="background:#fcc"
| 59
| April 23
| @ Golden State
| 
| Michael Porter Jr. (26)
| Paul Millsap (7)
| Nikola Jokic (6)
| Chase Center1,935
| 38–21
|- style="background:#cfc"
| 60
| April 24
| Houston
| 
| Michael Porter Jr. (39)
| Nikola Jokic (8)
| Facundo Campazzo (13)
| Ball Arena4,035
| 39–21
|- style="background:#cfc"
| 61
| April 26
| Memphis
| 
| Michael Porter Jr. (31)
| Nikola Jokic (15)
| Facundo Campazzo (7)
| Ball Arena3,823
| 40–21
|- style="background:#cfc"
| 62
| April 28
| New Orleans
| 
| Nikola Jokic (32)
| Michael Porter Jr. (8)
| Facundo Campazzo (10)
| Ball Arena4,022
| 41–21
|- style="background:#cfc"
| 63
| April 29
| Toronto
| 
| Michael Porter Jr. (23)
| Nikola Jokic (11)
| Campazzo & Gordon (4)
| Ball Arena4,025
| 42–21

|- style="background:#cfc"
| 64
| May 1
| @ L. A. Clippers
| 
| Nikola Jokic (30)
| Nikola Jokic (14)
| Nikola Jokic (7)
| Staples Center2,818
| 43–21
|- style="background:#fcc"
| 65
| May 3
| @ L. A. Lakers
| 
| Nikola Jokic (32)
| Nikola Jokic (9)
| Facundo Campazzo (8)
| Staples Center2,454
| 43–22
|- style="background:#cfc"
| 66
| May 5
| New York
| 
| Nikola Jokic (32)
| Nikola Jokic (12)
| Nikola Jokic (6)
| Ball Arena4,038
| 44–22
|- style="background:#fcc"
| 67
| May 7
| @ Utah
| 
| Michael Porter Jr. (31)
| Nikola Jokic (9)
| Nikola Jokic (13)
| Vivint Arena6,506
| 44–23
|- style="background:#fcc"
| 68
| May 8
| Brooklyn
| 
| Nikola Jokic (29)
| Nikola Jokic (7)
| Nikola Jokic (6)
| Ball Arena4,044
| 44–24
|- style="background:#cfc"
| 69
| May 11
| @ Charlotte
| 
| Jokic & Porter Jr. (30)
| Nikola Jokic (11)
| Campazzo & Jokic (6)
| Spectrum Center3,997
| 45–24
|- style="background:#cfc"
| 70
| May 13
| @ Minnesota
| 
| Nikola Jokic (31)
| Nikola Jokic (14)
| Facundo Campazzo (9)
| Target Center1,638
| 46–24
|- style="background:#cfc"
| 71
| May 14
| @ Detroit
| 
| Howard & Jokic (20)
| Nikola Jokic (15)
| Nikola Jokic (11)
| Little Caesars Arena750
| 47–24
|- style="background:#fcc"
| 72
| May 16
| @ Portland
| 
| Markus Howard (23)
| JaVale McGee (8)
| Monté Morris (4)
| Moda Center1,939
| 47–25

Playoffs 

|- style="background:#fcc;"
| 1
| May 22
| Portland
| 
| Nikola Jokić (34)
| Nikola Jokić (16)
| Campazzo, Morris (5)
| Ball Arena7,732
| 0–1
|- style="background:#cfc;"
| 2
| May 24
| Portland
| 
| Nikola Jokić (38)
| Nikola Jokić (8)
| Monté Morris (7)
| Ball Arena7,727
| 1–1
|- style="background:#cfc;"
| 3
| May 27
| @ Portland
| 
| Nikola Jokić (36)
| Nikola Jokić (11)
| Facundo Campazzo (8)
| Moda Center8,050
| 2–1
|- style="background:#fcc;"
| 4
| May 29
| @ Portland
| 
| Nikola Jokić (16)
| Nikola Jokić (9)
| Facundo Campazzo (7)
| Moda Center8,050
| 2–2
|- style="background:#cfc;"
| 5
| June 1
| Portland
| 
| Nikola Jokić (38)
| Michael Porter Jr. (12)
| Nikola Jokić (9)
| Ball Arena10,463
| 3–2
|- style="background:#cfc;"
| 6
| June 3
| @ Portland
| 
| Nikola Jokić (36)
| JaMychal Green (9)
| Monté Morris (9)
| Moda Center10,022
| 4–2

|- style="background:#fcc;"
| 1
| June 7
| @ Phoenix
| 
| Nikola Jokić (22)
| JaMychal Green (11)
| Campazzo, Morris (6)
| Phoenix Suns Arena16,219
| 0–1
|- style="background:#fcc;"
| 2
| June 9
| @ Phoenix
| 
| Nikola Jokić (24)
| Nikola Jokić (13)
| Nikola Jokić (6)
| Phoenix Suns Arena16,529
| 0–2
|- style="background:#fcc;"
| 3
| June 11
| Phoenix
| 
| Nikola Jokić (32)
| Nikola Jokić (20)
| Nikola Jokić (10)
| Ball Arena18,277
| 0–3
|- style="background:#fcc;"
| 4
| June 13
| Phoenix
| 
| Will Barton (25)
| Nikola Jokić (11)
| Monté Morris (6)
| Ball Arena18,290
| 0–4

Player statistics

Regular season

|- align="center" bgcolor=""
| 
| 56 || 52 || 31.0 || .426 || .381 || .785 || 4.0 || 3.2 || .9 || .4 || 12.7
|- align="center" bgcolor=""
| 
| 32 || 2 || 5.0 || .431 || .375 || .667 || .8 || .2 || .1 || .3 || 2.2
|- align="center" bgcolor=""
| 
| 65 || 19 || 21.9 || .381 || .352 || style=|.879 || 2.1 || 3.6 || 1.2 || .2 || 6.1
|- align="center" bgcolor=""
| 
| 41 || 1 || 6.9 || .458 || .273 || .769 || 1.2 || .3 || .3 || .0 || 2.1
|- align="center" bgcolor=""
| 
| 2 || 0 || 2.0 || .000 || .000 || .000 || .5 || .0 || .0 || .0 || .0
|- align="center" bgcolor=""
| 
| 50 || 6 || 21.8 || .417 || .315 || .636 || 3.6 || 1.8 || .6 || .4 || 7.7
|- align="center" bgcolor=""
| 
| 25 || 25 || 25.9 || .500 || .266 || .705 || 4.7 || 2.2 || .7 || .6 || 10.2
|- align="center" bgcolor=""
| 
| 58 || 5 || 19.3 || .463 || .399 || .807 || 4.8 || .9 || .4 || .4 || 8.1
|- align="center" bgcolor=""
| 
| 25 || 0 || 9.3 || .417 || .278 || .750 || 2.0 || .6 || .2 || .1 || 2.6
|- align="center" bgcolor=""
| 
| 19 || 19 || 30.6 || .442 || .320 || .733 || 2.5 || 1.7 || .9 || .2 || 9.7
|- align="center" bgcolor=""
| 
| 17 || 0 || 16.3 || .345 || .214 || .813 || 2.3 || .9 || .9 || .3 || 3.3
|- align="center" bgcolor=""
| 
| 30 || 0 || 9.1 || .513 || .000 || .611 || 2.8 || .5 || .4 || .7 || 3.5
|- align="center" bgcolor=""
| 
| 37 || 1 || 5.5 || .377 || .277 || .778 || .6 || .5 || .1 || .0 || 2.8
|- align="center" bgcolor=""
| 
| style=|72 || style=|72 || 34.6 || style=|.566 || .388 || .868 || style=|10.8 || style=|8.3 || style=|1.3 || .7 || style=|26.4
|- align="center" bgcolor=""
| 
| 13 || 1 || 13.5 || .478 || .000 || .667 || 5.3 || .5 || .2 || style=|1.1 || 5.5
|- align="center" bgcolor=""
| 
| 56 || 36 || 20.8 || .476 || .343 || .724 || 4.7 || 1.8 || .9 || .6 || 9.0
|- align="center" bgcolor=""
| 
| 47 || 13 || 25.5 || .481 || .381 || .795 || 2.0 || 3.2 || .7 || .3 || 10.2
|- align="center" bgcolor=""
| 
| 48 || 48 || style=|35.5 || .477 || .408 || .869|| 4.0 || 4.8 || style=|1.3 || .3 || 21.2
|- align="center" bgcolor=""
| 
| 42 || 1 || 9.5 || .481 || .407 || .800 || 1.5 || .2 || .2 || .1 || 3.2
|- align="center" bgcolor=""
| 
| 61 || 54 || 31.3 || .542 || style=|.445 || .791 || 7.3 || 1.1 || .7 || .9 || 19.0
|- align="center" bgcolor=""
| 
| 15 || 5 || 26.9 || .418 || .375 || .706 || 2.3 || 2.6 || 1.2 || .1 || 8.7
|- align="center" bgcolor=""
| 
| 4 || 0 || 3.0 || .000 || .000 || .000 || .0 || .0 || .0 || .0 || .0
|}

Playoffs

|- align="center" bgcolor=""
| 
| 3 || 1 || 27.7 || .442 || .333 || 1.000 || 4.3 || 2.7 || .7 || .3 || 16.3
|- align="center" bgcolor=""
| 
| 3 || 0 || 2.0 || .000 || .000 || .000 || .3 || .7 || .0 || .0 || .0
|- align="center" bgcolor=""
| 
| 10 || 9 || 27.0 || .392 || .396 || .842 || 3.0 || 4.1 || 1.4 || .4 || 9.3
|- align="center" bgcolor=""
| 
| 5 || 0 || 4.2 || 1.000 || 1.000 || .800 || .6 || .2 || .2 || .2 || 2.2
|- align="center" bgcolor=""
| 
| 10 || 10 || 29.9 || .434 || .391 || .640 || 5.4 || 2.0 || .5 || .3 || 11.1
|- align="center" bgcolor=""
| 
| 10 || 0 || 19.0 || .444 || .300 || .889 || 5.2 || 1.1 || .2 || .2 || 5.4
|- align="center" bgcolor=""
| 
| 9 || 0 || 4.4 || .750 || 1.000 || .667 || .9 || .3 || .3 || .3 || 1.0
|- align="center" bgcolor=""
| 
| 9 || 0 || 12.4 || .405 || .423 || .500 || .8 || .4 || .0 || .1 || 4.7
|- align="center" bgcolor=""
| 
| 10 || 10 || 34.5 || .509 || .377 || .836 || 11.6 || 5.0 || .6 || .9 || 29.8
|- align="center" bgcolor=""
| 
| 4 || 0 || 8.5 || .300 || .000 || .333 || 3.0 || .8 || .3 || 1.3 || 2.0
|- align="center" bgcolor=""
| 
| 9 || 0 || 12.1 || .440 || .261 || .615 || 3.9 || 1.7 || .3 || .7 || 6.4
|- align="center" bgcolor=""
| 
| 10 || 1 || 28.6 || .431 || .400 || .724 || 2.4 || 5.5 || 1.0 || .2 || 13.7
|- align="center" bgcolor=""
| 
| 5 || 0 || 3.6 || .500 || .429 || .500 || .4 || .4 || .2 || .0 || 2.4
|- align="center" bgcolor=""
| 
| 10 || 10 || 33.2 || .474 || .397 || .810 || 6.2 || 1.3 || 1.1 || .3 || 17.4
|- align="center" bgcolor=""
| 
| 10 || 9 || 30.5 || .435 || .413 || .813 || 1.7 || 2.1 || .2 || .3 || 9.2
|}

Transactions

Overview

Trades

Free agency

Re-signed

Additions

Subtractions

References

Denver Nuggets seasons
Denver Nuggets
Denver Nuggets
Denver Nuggets